Genowefa Migas-Stawarz (born 18 January 1935) is a Polish fencer. She competed in the women's team foil event at the 1960 Summer Olympics.

References

1935 births
Living people
Polish female fencers
Olympic fencers of Poland
Fencers at the 1960 Summer Olympics
Sportspeople from Kraków